Xuanzang or Xuan Zang is a 2016 Chinese-Indian historical adventure film based on Xuanzang's seventeen-year overland journey to India during the Tang dynasty in the seventh century. The film is directed by Huo Jianqi and produced by Wong Kar-wai. It stars Huang Xiaoming, Kent Tong, Purba Rgyal, Sonu Sood and Tan Kai. It was released in China and India on 29 April 2016, with distribution in China by China Film Group Corporation. It was selected as the Chinese entry for the Best Foreign Language Film at the 89th Academy Awards but was not nominated. 'Xuan Zang' was screened at the 2nd Annual Asian World Film Festival on 31 October 2016 in Culver City.

Plot
During the Tang Dynasty's era of "Zhen Guan" (of Emperor Taizong), Xuan Zang, a young Buddhist monk, in his quest to find the knowledge in Buddhism, embarks on a journey to India, that is fraught with perils and dangers. He encounters natural disasters, and sees the sufferings of the common people. Soldiers get in his way, his disciple betrays him, he struggles through deserts, and is short on food and water. He finally arrives in India, and studies Buddhism in earnest. By the time he returns to China, he is 50 years old.
This film is based on a folk tale told by Wu Ch'eng-en and translated by Arthur Waley in his allegorical book 'Monkey' published by Allen and Unwin Ltd in 1942. According to Waley, Wu Ch'eng-en lived between AD 1505 and 1580. Hsuan Tsang (Xuanzang) the monk, is known as Tripitaka in the book, and is a real person who lived in the seventh century AD.

Cast

Soundtrack
"Heart Sutra" performed by Faye Wong
"Qiannian Yibore" performed by Huang Xiaoming & Han Lei

Production
On 4 May 2015, the producers held the Sino-Indian Cooperation and Exchange News Briefing Film Conference in Beijing and announced that they would be producing the film with India. The film is being produced by the Chinese state owned production company China Film Corporation and Eros International.

Principal photography began on 6 June 2015, at the Flaming Mountains in Turpan, Xinjiang. Huang Xiaoming played the most important role: Tang dynasty monk Xuanzang.

Filming took place in Turpan region, Changji, Altay, Aksu, Kashi and nearly ten areas of Gansu, India and other cross-border.

Reception
The film grossed  on its opening weekend in China.

Awards and nominations
12th Chinese American Film Festival 
Golden Angel Award Film
Best Screenwriter
31st Golden Rooster Awards
Nominated – Best Cinematography (Sun Ming)
Nominated – Best Sound (Chao Jun)
Nominated – Best Art Direction (Wu Ming)
Nominated – Best Original Music Score (Wang Xiaofeng)

See also
 List of submissions to the 89th Academy Awards for Best Foreign Language Film
 List of Chinese submissions for the Academy Award for Best Foreign Language Film

References

External links
 
 

2016 films
Films set in ancient India
Films shot in Xinjiang
Films shot in Gansu
Films shot in India
2010s Mandarin-language films
2010s English-language films
Films directed by Huo Jianqi
China Film Group Corporation films
Films set in 7th-century Tang dynasty
Chinese historical adventure films
Chinese multilingual films
Indian multilingual films
2010s historical adventure films
Chinese biographical films
2010s biographical films
Films about Buddhism
Films with screenplays by Zou Jingzhi
Indian historical adventure films